Prince Michael Imeretinsky AFC (Mikheil Imeretinski; , Mikhail Georgyevich Imeretinsky) (27 January 1900 – 14 April 1975) was a British military officer of Georgian royal descent. He belonged to the Bagrationi dynasty and directly descended from the Kings of Imereti.

Michael Imeretinsky was born to a Georgian father, "Serene Prince" George Imeretinsky (1872–1932), and a Russian mother, Lidya Nikolayevna Klimova (1880–1956), in St. Petersburg. He descended from the royal dynasty of the western Georgian kingdom of Imereti, which had been conquered by the Russian Empire in 1810. Like his elder brother, George, Michael Imeretinsky received his early education at the Lancing College in the United Kingdom and enlisted in the Royal Flying Corps as a sub-lieutenant in 1918. He fought in both World War I and World War II, serving as a squadron commander of the Royal Air Force Volunteer Reserve on the latter occasion. He was decorated with the Air Force Cross. After his retirement from the military, Imeretinsky lived in the United Kingdom and France. He devoted himself to agriculture, being—as his obituary put it—"a prominent member of the Soil Association and a well-known horticulturist in France." In 1975, he died, aged 75, in Nice, being the last direct male descendant of the kings of Imereti.

Prince Imeretinsky married Margaret Stella Wright (born 1899) in 1925. They had three daughters:

Tamara Imeretinsky (born 1926)
Natalia Imeretinsky (born 1930)
Nadezhda Imeretinsky  (born 1941)

References

1900 births
1975 deaths
Georgian princes
Bagrationi dynasty of the Kingdom of Imereti
People educated at Lancing College
Georgian emigrants to England
Georgian people of Russian descent
Royal Flying Corps officers
Royal Air Force squadron leaders
Royal Air Force personnel of World War I
Royal Air Force Volunteer Reserve personnel of World War II
British horticulturists
British landowners
Recipients of the Air Force Cross (United Kingdom)
Russian emigrants to the United Kingdom
Emigrants from the Russian Empire to the United Kingdom
Russian people of Georgian descent
Royalty from Saint Petersburg
Georgian emigrants to France
Russian emigrants to France
British Army personnel of World War I